The Danbury Railway Museum  is a railway museum housed in the former Union Station on the east end of downtown Danbury, Connecticut, United States. It was established in the mid-1990s following the closure of the station by the Metro-North Railroad in favor of a new station nearby, and primarily focuses on the history of railroading in southern New England and neighboring New York. In addition to the former station building, the museum has a collection of heritage railcars in the neighboring rail yard it shares with Metro-North.

The station was built in 1903 by the New York, New Haven and Hartford Railroad in response to local pressure for a new station after the three railroads that served the city were merged into the New Haven. At the station's peak, 125 trains stopped there in a day. By 1993, that had dwindled to a few commuter trains, and the Connecticut Department of Transportation, which by then owned the neglected building, closed it in favor of a newer station on the other side of the block. Within two years the museum was formed and restored the station to its former appearance.

It is architecturally distinctive, with Colonial Revival touches on a Richardsonian Romanesque structure. Alfred Hitchcock filmed station scenes for Strangers on a Train on its distinctive curved platform. In 1986, prior to the museum's use of the building, it was listed on the National Register of Historic Places. It was joined on the Register in 2005 by the former turntable, the only intact one in the state.

Site

The museum itself is located on a  lot at the southeast corner of White Street and Patriot Drive, just across from Meeker's Hardware, which is also on the Register. To its west is a parking lot with room for 25 cars. Immediately behind it, to the south, are the railroad tracks and a  rail yard. The current Danbury station is a short distance away, and sometimes Metro-North stores its trains on the tracks behind the station between runs. The museum's collection of older cars is on the tracks in the yard's interior. A grade crossing on White marks the eastern terminus of the Beacon Line kept in reserve by Metro-North for possible future use.

Building
The station building is a one-story L-shaped structure of buff and brown brick with sandstone trim, both wings topped with gabled roofs covered in asphalt. Hipped-roof dormer windows pierce the north and west elevations, and similar canopies run along the tracks on either side, continuing the overhanging bracketed eaves that shelter the platform on the building itself. A single chimney rises from the south end of the station, near where the sets of tracks meet.

Windows vary in size and shape. Those on the east are high and small, whereas tall windows that give the impression of sidelights are along the southwest, next to the tracks. These are hints of the Colonial Revival style that was emerging at the time of the station's construction.

Inside, the museum's exhibits and displays occupy the  southern half of the building, its former waiting room. In the northern half, is the museum's gift shop and restrooms. The original ticket window and the varnished pine door and window architraves. Immediately east of the entry is a fireplace whose mantel is decorated in molded brick in floral patterns.

The facility comprises a railroad yard full of restored and unrestored railroad equipment, and the restored station house containing exhibits of photographs and railroad paraphernalia, model train layouts, an extensive reference library, and a gift shop. The station is "significant in the history of Danbury" and also as a "good example" of a turn-of-the-twentieth-century railway station building. Its architectural style of the hip-roofed station is eclectic, with exterior Richardsonian and Colonial Revival elements. Its interior workmanship is more impressive.

Yard

Visitors can ride the "Rail Yard Local" on weekends in the summer season. The ride takes about 30–35 minutes and includes a unique ride by the passengers on the museum's operating turntable, and a tour of the recently restored Danbury fairground's pumphouse. The turntable was added to the National Register of Historic Places on September 15, 2005. The turntable, built around 1914 was originally part of a roundhouse and machine shop complex. A fire destroyed the buildings in the 1980s, leaving "the only intact surviving [railroad] turntable in Connecticut". It is essentially a swing bridge, and is located several hundred yards east of the station.

Some of the rolling stock in the yard, including its 1907-built 2-6-0 steam locomotive (B&M #1455), two cabooses, a Budd Company self-propelled rail diesel car, and a Sperry track inspection car, are open to the visitors. The museum is an all-volunteer operation and welcomes anyone who would like to participate in any of the many facets of its operations – including operating its locomotives and self-propelled cars.

History
By the 1880s, the three railroads that served the city — the Danbury and Norwalk, Housatonic and New York and New England — had built small, separate stations for their lines in the vicinity of the current building. Later in that decade, economic difficulties led to them all becoming part of the New York, New Haven and Hartford, leading it to be known locally as the Consolidated Road. Citizens began asking the new owner to consolidate its three stations into one as early as 1894, two years after the last merger.

In 1901, the Consolidated realigned the tracks and built the new station where the New York & New England's passenger depot had been. A. Malkin's design combined a basic Richardsonian Romanesque structure with some Colonial Revival details, like the small panes in the windows. It was said to be the largest station on the New Haven's New York Division.

In its peak years, early in the 20th century, extant timetables suggest the station saw as many as 125 trains a day. Much of that passenger traffic was related to the city's large hatmaking industry, with workers migrating to and from jobs, and business travelers selling to or buying from the hatmakers. It was acknowledged with a neon sign on a nearby coal shed showing a derby hat coming down on a crown and saying "Danbury Crowns Them All". The hat-related traffic grew around the industry's two big seasons, the Christmas and Easter holidays. Other passengers were commuters going to jobs in Bridgeport or New York City, summer travelers headed for country retreats and hotels in the area, or visitors to the Danbury Fair, held every October.

After World War II, train ridership began to decline with the rise of passenger air travel and the Interstate Highway System. The decline of hatmaking, as many Americans started going around bareheaded, also contributed. Many of the station's original decorative features were removed. The New Haven's passenger train services to northwestern Connecticut, the Berkshires and to Pittsfield, Massachusetts were cut to weekend-only service by 1961. The last named train on the route, the Berkshire, was discontinued in 1968. In the late 1960s the Consolidated was itself absorbed into the short-lived Penn Central conglomerate. The last intercity passenger train left for Pittsfield in 1972, and the next year the Penn Central's final failure put its trains in the hands of Conrail and the station itself became property of the state Department of Transportation (ConnDOT).

Metro-North closed the station, the northern terminus of the New Haven Line's Danbury Branch, in 1993. The city's mayor, Gene Eriquez, who had seen downtown wither as retail business and customers went to the mall built on the former fairgrounds, did not want to see another old building lost to urban blight. The station seemed to him and others the ideal place for a rail museum that could attract visitors, and the Danbury Railway Museum was formed the next year by a group of National Railway Historical Society and local railfans.

Soon it grew to a hundred members. The first excursion train was run later that year. A temporary museum was established in an Ives Street storefront while the old station itself was restored with a $1.5 million grant. In late 1995 the restored station was rededicated at a ceremony attended by the mayor and a thousand people. The museum interior was opened in the middle of the following year.

The turntable was restored in 1998. Since 2005 it has been a regular stop on the Railyard Local. Today the museum has 550 members and 60 pieces of equipment.

See also
List of heritage railroads in the United States
List of railway museums
National Register of Historic Places listings in Fairfield County, Connecticut

References

External links

<div class="plainlinks">

Photos from the Danbury Railway Museum's annual Railway Day (2010)

Railroad museums in Connecticut
Former railway stations in Connecticut
Stations along New York, New Haven and Hartford Railroad lines
Heritage railroads in Connecticut
National Register of Historic Places in Fairfield County, Connecticut
Museums in Danbury, Connecticut
Railway stations in the United States opened in 1903
Railway stations closed in 1993
Railway stations on the National Register of Historic Places in Connecticut
Model railway shows and exhibitions
Romanesque Revival architecture in Connecticut
Museums established in 1994
1994 establishments in Connecticut
Railroad roundhouses in Connecticut